The Assembly Line was a British video game development company which created games for the Atari ST, Commodore 64 and Amiga systems. Recognized for the quality of its programming, it mostly created 3D action or puzzle games.

Games 
 Xenon 2 Megablast (coded by The Assembly Line, designed by the Bitmap Brothers)
 Interphase
 Cybercon III
 Pipe Mania also known as Pipe Dream
 E-Motion also known as  The Game of Harmony and Sphericule
 Vaxine
 Helter Skelter
 Stunt Island (Published by Disney Interactive)

Developers 

Developers include:

 Andy Beveridge
 Adrian Stephens
 Martin Day
 John Dale

References 

Defunct video game companies of the United Kingdom
Video game development companies